The Asia and Pacific Museum, in Warsaw, Poland, was founded in 1973 from a private collection of Oriental art amassed by Andrzej Wawrzyniak, sailor, diplomat, and connoisseur–collector of Oriental art. After returning to Poland, he donated his collection, numbering over 3,000 objects, to Poland. Thus the Museum of the Nusantara Archipelago was created in Warsaw in 1973.

In 1973 the Museum, continually enhanced with objects from oadditional regions of the world, became the Asia and Pacific Museum, with Wawrzyniak as its lifetime director and chief curator. The Museum's holdings include over 20,000 objects from Asia, Australia, and Oceania.

Galeria

References

External links

 Official website (Polish)

Museums established in 1973
Museums in Warsaw
Art museums and galleries in Poland
Asian art museums in Poland
Registered museums in Poland